The Federal Correctional Complex, Forrest City (FCC Forrest City) is a United States federal prison complex for male inmates in Arkansas. It is operated by the Federal Bureau of Prisons, a division of the United States Department of Justice.

The complex consists of three facilities:

 SPC Forrest City (Satellite Prison Camp): a minimum-security facility for minimum-security inmates.
Federal Correctional Institution, Forrest City Low (FCI Forrest City Low): a low-security facility for low-security inmates.
Federal Correctional Institution, Forrest City Medium (FCI Forrest City Medium): a medium-security facility for medium-security inmates.

See also

List of U.S. federal prisons
Federal Bureau of Prisons
Incarceration in the United States

References

External links

Forrest City
Forrest City
Buildings and structures in St. Francis County, Arkansas
Forrest City, Arkansas